Lichtenhagen, from the oldgerman designation for Clear Grove is the name for many urban places like

 Rostock-Lichtenhagen, borough of Rostock, Germany
 Elmenhorst/Lichtenhagen, Bad Doberan, Germany
 neighborhood of Friedland, Lower Saxony, Germany
 village in Ottenstein, Germany
 neighbourhood of Knüllwald, Schwalm-Eder-Kreis, Germany
 Forest Lichtenhagen, Schermbeck, Germany

Other uses include:
 Silke Lichtenhagen (*1973), German athlete
 Riot of Rostock-Lichtenhagen